Voila is a commune in Brașov County, Transylvania, Romania. It is composed of six villages: Cincșor (Kleinschenk; Kissink), Dridif (Dridif), Ludișor (Ludisor), Sâmbăta de Jos (Untermühlendorf; Alsószombatfalva), Voila, and Voivodeni (Nagyvajdafalva). It included Sâmbăta de Sus and Stațiunea Climaterică Sâmbăta villages until 2003, when these were split off to form Sâmbăta de Sus commune.

The Voila commune is located in the western part of the county, in the historic Țara Făgărașului region, on the left bank of the river Olt. The rivers Breaza and Sâmbăta discharge into the Olt at Voila.

Gallery

References

Communes in Brașov County
Localities in Transylvania